Marianna Vardinogiannis (née Μπουρνάκη Bournaki) married to Greek shipping magnate Vardis Vardinogiannis, is a UNESCO Goodwill Ambassador and an activist for the rights of children and the family, and against child sexual abuse  via her Foundation for the Child and the Family. She has been the President of the Elpida Association of friends of children with cancer.

Early life, education and family
Marianna Vardinogiannis was born in Athens, Greece (1943) and raised in Ermione, birthplace of her mother, Evangelia. Her father was George Bournakis. She studied Economics at the University of Denver in Colorado after her graduation from a high school in Athens. She is married to Vardis Vardinogiannis and they have five children.

International and regional activities
Marianna Vardinogiannis began her activities as a member of various organizations, associations and philanthropic organizations, from which she has fought for international peace and global solidarity, although her primary focus has been mainly on the problems of children: health, education, social welfare and poverty, child abuse and exploitation.

She has developed strong relationships with several international personalities, such as Queen Rania of Jordan, Suzanne Mubarak, several networks, collaborations and organizations such as the Global Coalition Women Defending Peace.

In 2013 Marianna Vardinogiannis joined the Nizami Ganjavi International Center Board along with Ismail Serageldin, Vaira Vike-Freiberga, Tarja Halonen, Suleyman Demirel, Roza Otunbayeva, Ambassador Walter Fust and Federico Mayor Zaragoza.

Elpida Children's Oncology Hospital
On 14 October 2010, the Elpida (Hope) Children's Oncology Hospital (located in Athens, Greece), was inaugurated and opened to the public. Elpida, which is Vardinogiannis' lifetime goal, focuses on the care of children with cancer.

Awards and honors
 Légion d'Honneur. Title conferred in 2006 by the French Republic. Title of Officier conferred in 2015.
 Golden Cross of the Order of Beneficence by the Hellenic Republic
The 2020 Nelson Mandela Prize by the United Nations General Assembly

See also
 Vardinogiannis Foundation

References

External links
 Ambassador of Good Will Marianna Vardinoyannis on the official Website of U.N.E.S.C.O.  - 
 Official Website of Elpida Children's Oncology Hospital  - 

Living people
Children's rights activists
Greek activists
Greek philanthropists
People from Athens
UNESCO Goodwill Ambassadors
University of Denver alumni
Officiers of the Légion d'honneur
Order of Beneficence (Greece)
Recipients of Greek civil awards and decorations
Year of birth missing (living people)